Who's Foolin' Who is a 1982 album by the Detroit R&B band One Way.

Reception

The album includes the band's highest chart appearance in the United States, "Cutie Pie", which peaked at #61 on the Hot 100 (the band's only foray onto the Hot 100), #29 on the dance charts, and #4 on the R&B charts. The album's title track, "Who's Foolin' Who" was also released as the lead single, peaking at number 34 on the R&B chart. It did best in South Africa, where it reached number seven.  "Who's Foolin' Who" has been covered by the Eurodance band, Double You on their 1992 album We All Need Love.

The album itself peaked #51 on the Billboard 200 and #8 on the R&B charts. Aside from 1984's #1 R&B album, Lady, this album is the highest charting in their seven-year run.

Incidentally, former One Way vocalist Alicia Myers released a solo album that same year (1982) entitled I Fooled You this Time.  It is unclear which album (Myers' or this one) was recorded first, but evidently, the similarity in album titles was intentional.  Specifically, if her album was released first, then One Way's album title Who's Foolin' Who can be seen as a sort of "response" to her album, or vice versa.  The songs on Myers' album were written and produced by One Way bandmembers, so apparently, the whole sequence of events was tongue-in-cheek, and there was no animosity between the two camps.

Track listing
 "Cutie Pie" 5:25
 "Sweet Lady" 3:40
 "You" 4:41
 "You're So Very Special" 4:57
 "Who's Foolin' Who" 5:13
 "Age Ain't Nothing But a Number" 3:47
 "Give Me One More Chance" 4:47
 "Runnin' Away" 5:10

Bonus tracks from other One Way albums appeared on the Japan import CD version of this album, released in 1993 ("Pull/Fancy Dancer" from 1981's Fancy Dancer and "Let's Talk About Sex" from 1985's Wrap Your Body).

Personnel

One Way
Al Hudson: Percussion, Lead and Backing vocals
Dave Roberson: Guitar, Lead and Background vocals, Vibes, Keyboard
Kevin McCord: Bass guitar, Lead and Background vocals, Linn, Keyboard
Cortez Harris: Lead guitar, Lead and Background vocals
Candyce Edwards: Lead and Background vocals
Gregory Green: Drums, Percussions (sic)
Jonathan "Corky" Meadows: Keyboards and Prophet-Five

Additional Musician
Maurice Davis: Horns

Charts

Weekly charts

Year-end charts

Singles

References

External links
 One Way-Who's Foolin' Who at Discogs

1982 albums
MCA Records albums
Soul albums by American artists
Funk albums by American artists